Wild grass may refer to:

 Grass that is uncultivated.
 Wild Grass, the English-language title of Les Herbes folles, a 2009 film directed by Alain Resnais.